Andreas Stavrou  (born October 27, 1988) is a Cypriot footballer, who plays for Karmiotissa FC.

Career
Stavrou joined Karmiotissa FC in August 2019.

Career

External links

1988 births
Living people
Cypriot footballers
Association football midfielders
Cypriot First Division players
Apollon Limassol FC players
PAEEK players
AEL Limassol players
Karmiotissa FC players
Pafos FC players
Alki Oroklini players